Breweries in Iowa produce a wide range of beers in different styles that are marketed locally and regionally. Brewing companies vary widely in the volume and variety of beer produced,  from small nanobreweries to microbreweries to massive multinational conglomerate macrobreweries. Iowa is a state located in the Midwestern United States, an area often referred to as the "American Heartland".

In 2012 Iowa's 38 breweries and brewpubs employed 140 people directly, and more than 12,000 others in related jobs such as wholesaling and retailing. Including people directly employed in brewing, as well as those who supply Iowa's breweries with everything from ingredients to machinery, the total business and personal tax revenue generated by Iowa's breweries and related industries was more than $230 million. Consumer purchases of Iowa's brewery products generated more than $100 million additional tax revenue. In 2012, according to the Brewers Association, Iowa ranked 15th in the number of craft breweries per capita with 33.

For context, at the end of 2013 there were 2,822 breweries in the United States, including 2,768 craft breweries subdivided into 1,237 brewpubs, 1,412 microbreweries and 119 regional craft breweries.  In that same year, according to the Beer Institute, the brewing industry employed around 43,000 Americans in brewing and distribution and had a combined economic impact of more than $246 billion.

Breweries in Iowa

 1st Down Brewing Co. – Winterset
5 Alarm Brewing Company – Lake Mills
 515 Brewing Company – Clive
7 Hills Brewing Company – Dubuque, Dyersville
Adventurous Brewing Company – Bettendorf
Allerton Brewing Company – Independence
 Alluvial Brewing Company – Ames
Backcountry Winery & Brewery – Stratford
 Backpocket Brewing – Coralville, Dubuque
BackRoad Brewery – Carlisle
 Barn Town Brewing – West Des Moines
Benton County Brewing Company – Belle Plaine
 Big's BBQ Brew Pub – Mt. Vernon
 Big Grove Brewery – Des Moines, Iowa City, Solon
Big Rack Brew Haus – Winterset
BIT Brewery – Central City
Blind Butcher Brewing Company – Inwood
Boone Valley Brewing Co. – Boone
Bremer Brewing Company – Waverly
Breü Haus Coffee + Brewery – Sheldon
Brew-lik Brewing Company – Olin
 Brightside Aleworks – Altoona
Brioux City Brewery – Sioux City
Catfish Creek Brew Pub – Dubuque
Clock House Brewing – Cedar Rapids
 Confluence Brewing Company – Des Moines
 Contrary Brewing Company – Muscatine
 Court Avenue Brewing Company – Des Moines
 Crawford Brew Works – Bettendorf
 Deb's Brewtopia – Elkader
 Depot Restaurant & Lounge – Shenandoah
Dimensional Brewing Company – Dubuque, Peosta
Drink Me Brewing Company – Sibley
E18 Brewing Company – Boone
 Exile Brewing Company – Des Moines
Farmhand Brewing Company – Earling
 Fat Hill Brewing – Mason City
 Fenceline Beer Lab – Huxley
Fenders Brewing – Polk City
 Firetrucker Brewery – Ankeny
 Five Cities Brewing – Bettendorf
Flix Brewhouse – Des Moines
 Fox Brewing Company – West Des Moines 
 Franklin Street Brewing Company – Manchester
 Front Street Brewery – Davenport
Full Fledged Brewing Company – Council Bluffs
Gamble Block Brewery – Perry
Gezellig Brewing Co – Newton
Granite City Food & Brewery – Cedar Rapids, Davenport
Green Tree Brewery – Le Claire
Guttenberg Brewing Company – Guttenberg
Hot Air Brewing – Creston
House Divided Brewery – Ely
Into Brewing Company – Indianola
 Iowa Brewing Company – Cedar Rapids
Jackson Street Brewing – Sioux City
 Jubeck New World Brewing – Dubuque
 Kalona Brewing Company – Kalona
 Keg Creek Brewing Company – Glenwood
Kinship Brewing Company – Waukee
Lake Time Brewery – Clear Lake
Lark Brewing – Cedar Falls
Late Harvest Brewery – Sioux Center
Limestone Brewers – Osage
 Lion Bridge Brewing Company – Cedar Rapids
Lost Duck Brewing Company – Fort Madison
Lua Brewing – Des Moines
Maquoketa Brewing – Maquoketa
Marto Brewing Co. – Sioux City
 Mason City Brewing Company – Mason City
 Millstream Brewing Company – Amana
Nerdspeak Brewery – Bettendorf
NoCoast Beer Co. – Oskaloosa
 Okoboji Brewing Company – Spirit Lake
Parkside Brewing Company – Burlington
 Peace Tree Brewing Company – Knoxville, Des Moines
PIVO Brewery – Calmar
 Pulpit Rock Brewing – Decorah
 Reclaimed Rails Brewing Company – Bondurant
 ReUnion Brewery  – Coralville, Iowa City
River Hops Brewing – Fort Dodge
River Ridge Brewing  – Bellevue
Rock River Brewing Company – Rock Rapids
Rustic Brew – Hampton
Second State Brewing Co. – Cedar Falls
 ShinyTop Brewing – Fort Dodge
 SingleSpeed Brewing Company – Cedar Falls, Waterloo
 Stompbox Brewing – Davenport
Tellurian Brewing – Charles City
Textile Brewing – Atkins, Cascade, Dyersville
The Granary – Eldridge
The Grange Public House and Brewery – Mount Pleasant
The Iowa Project Brewing Company – Spencer
The Old Man River Restaurant & Brewery – McGregor
The Press Room Brewery – Belmond
 The Quarter Barrel Arcade and Brewery  – Cedar Rapids
 Third Base Brewery – Cedar Rapids
Timbukbrü – Iowa Falls
Titonka Brewing Company – Titonka
TLC Brew Works – Holy Cross
 Toppling Goliath Brewery – Decorah
Torrent Brewing Company – Ames
Tractor Lift Brewing – Humboldt
Twin Span Brewing – Bettendorf
 Twisted Vine Brewery – West Des Moines
West Hill Brewing Company - Indianola
 West O Beer Company – West Okoboji
Wise I Brewing Company – Le Mars
 Worth Brewing Company – Northwood

See also 
 Beer in the United States
 List of breweries in the United States
 List of microbreweries

References 

Iowa
Breweries